Where'd You Go? is an EP by The Mighty Mighty Bosstones released in 1991 by Taang! Records. It features the title track, "Where'd You Go?" which also appeared on their 1992 LP, More Noise and Other Disturbances. The video for the song was shot in Boston and received minor MTV airplay. The EP also features cover versions of Aerosmith's "Sweet Emotion", Metallica's "Enter Sandman", and Van Halen's  "Ain't Talkin' 'bout Love", the last of which was ranked the 27th best punk cover song  by Paste in 2017. The EP also has an updated version of "Do Something Crazy", which previously appeared on The Mighty Mighty Bosstones' debut album, Devil's Night Out. In 2008 a rerecorded version of Where'd You Go? recorded by The Mighty Mighty Bosstones was released as a playable song for the game Rock Band 2.

Track listing
"Where'd You Go?" - 3:27
"Sweet Emotion" - 2:52
"Enter Sandman" - 2:58
"Do Something Crazy" - 2:13
"Ain't Talkin' 'bout Love" - 2:26

Personnel
Dicky Barrett – lead vocals
Nate Albert – guitar, backing vocals
Joe Gittleman – bass, backing vocals
Tim "Johnny Vegas" Burton – saxophone
Kevin Lenear – saxophone
Dennis Brockenborough – trombone
Josh Dalsimer – drums
Ben Carr – Bosstone, backing vocals
Paul "Sledge" Burton - trumpet
Paul Q. Kolderie - producer
Max Rose - producer

References

1991 debut EPs
Albums produced by Paul Q. Kolderie
The Mighty Mighty Bosstones EPs